Arsacius may refer to:
 Saint Arsatius or Arsacius
 Arsacius of Tarsus, the archbishop of Constantinople from 404 to 405.
 Arsacius (magister militum), Magister militum of the 5th century
 Arsacius of Nicomedia